Thomas N. Seyfried (born 1946) is an American professor of biology, genetics, and biochemistry at Boston College.  He received his PhD from the University of Illinois Urbana-Champaign in 1976.  His postdoctoral fellowship studies were in the Department of Neurology at the Yale University School of Medicine where he served as an assistant professor in neurology.  He did undergraduate work at the University of New England, formally St. Francis College, and received a master's degree in genetics from Illinois State University, Normal.

His research focuses on mechanisms of chronic diseases such as cancer, epilepsy, neurodegenerative lipid storage diseases, and caloric restriction diets.  Thomas N. Seyfried has been published in over 150 peer-reviewed publications.  He previously served as chair, Scientific Advisory Committee for the National Tay-Sachs and Allied Diseases Association and presently serves on several editorial boards, including those for Nutrition & Metabolism, Neurochemical Research, the Journal of Lipid Research, and ASN Neuro.  His 2012 book is Cancer as a Metabolic Disease: On the Origin, Management, and Prevention of Cancer.  Seyfried is a popular interview guest regarding the topic of cancer.

Seyfried also served in the United States Army during the Vietnam War, receiving the Bronze Star, the Air Medal, and the Army Commendation Medal.  His father, William E. Seyfried, Sr., served in the United States Merchant Marines during World War II and was president and founder of Capeway Paints in Brockton, Massachusetts.  His brother William E. Seyfried, Jr. is a University of Minnesota professor in the Department of Earth and Environmental Sciences who obtained a PhD from the University of Southern California.  Thomas Seyfried and his wife Karen live in Foxboro, Massachusetts.

References 

Fasting advocates
Living people
Recipients of the Air Medal
United States Army personnel of the Vietnam War
University of Illinois Urbana-Champaign alumni
1946 births